The Northern Ireland flags issue is one that divides the population along sectarian lines. Depending on political allegiance, people identify with differing flags and symbols, some of which have, or have had, official status in Northern Ireland.

Common flags

The flag of the United Kingdom, the Union Jack, is the only flag routinely used officially by the sovereign UK government, as well as being flown on most council buildings in Northern Ireland. The Union Flag is often flown by unionists but is disliked by nationalists. British law states that the Union Flag must be flown on designated days from central government buildings in Northern Ireland.
The Ulster Banner, the flag of the pre-1973 government of Northern Ireland, was used from 1953 to 1972 by the Stormont government to represent the government of Northern Ireland. That government was granted a royal warrant to fly the Ulster Banner in 1924, but this expired when the government was dissolved under the Northern Ireland Constitution Act 1973. It continues to be used by some sports teams representing Northern Ireland internationally, for example by the Northern Ireland football team, and by the Northern Ireland Commonwealth Games team.
The flag of Ireland or Irish tricolour is the state flag of the Republic of Ireland, and is regarded by republicans and nationalists as the flag of all of Ireland.
The Saint Patrick's Saltire represents Northern Ireland indirectly as Ireland in the Union Jack. It is sometimes flown during Saint Patrick's Day parades in Northern Ireland, and is used to represent Northern Ireland during some royal events.
Other flags flown by socialist republicans include the Starry Plough, the Sunburst flag and even the flag of the Ulster province. Loyalists sometimes display the flag of Scotland as a sign of their Scottish ancestry. Ulster nationalists use the unofficial 'Ulster Nation flag', although it has now been adopted as an Ulster-Scots flag.

Controversies
The Flags and Emblems (Display) Act (Northern Ireland) 1954 prohibited the display of any flag which was "likely to cause a breach of public order", and gave the police powers to deal with it. However, it specifically excluded the Union Jack from its provisions. In 1956, the Stormont Minister of Affairs, George Hanna, banned an Irish Nationalist cultural demonstration planned for the annual Feis at Newtownbutler, County Fermanagh. The march proceeded anyway, and in response the Royal Ulster Constabulary (RUC) launched a baton charge to seize a banner depicting Patrick Pearse but were unsuccessful. Police attempted a second baton charge which also failed and then resorted to using fire hoses against the crowds. Several people were injured during the disturbances, at least one seriously. The RUC had removed three Irish tricolours from the home of a parish priest during the previous year's Feis. In 1964, the RUC moved in to remove an Irish tricolour from the window of an office in Belfast, after Ian Paisley had publicly said that if they did not, he would do so personally. This resulted in serious rioting. The Act was repealed in 1987.

In some loyalist areas, the flying of flags supporting loyalist paramilitaries has proved controversial. Groups like the Ulster Defence Association, Ulster Volunteer Force, Young Citizen Volunteers, Red Hand Commando, and Loyalist Volunteer Force all have their own unique flags and although these flags usually appear alongside murals, they can occasionally be seen flying from lampposts in villages and towns or flying from houses in the run-up to the Twelfth.

After the 1998 Good Friday Agreement, flags continue to be a source of disagreement in Northern Ireland. The Agreement states that:

Some local councils have debated the usage of the Tricolour. In 2002 Belfast City Council displayed the Tricolour along with the Union Flag in the Lord Mayor's parlour during the term of Sinn Féin Lord Mayor Alex Maskey. A different approach was taken in 1997; when the Social Democratic and Labour Party's (SDLP) Alban Maginness was Lord Mayor, neither flag was displayed. In September 2003, Belfast City Council discussed flying the Tricolour alongside the Union Flag on designated occasions.

In June 2007 the designated nationalist Social Democratic and Labour Party complained about an artist's rendering of IKEA Belfast that included both the Union Flag and the Ulster Banner flag as two of the three flags in front of the store. After being labelled "an upmarket Orange hall" by the party, IKEA assured customers and co-workers that only the Swedish flag would be seen outside the actual store.

The Ulster Banner continued to be used by some local governments, such as the predominantly unionist Castlereagh, which flew it outside its offices.

A decision in December 2012 to fly the Union flag over Belfast City Hall only on certain designated days, instead of all the year round as previously, led to the Belfast City Hall flag protests, which included riots in which police officers were injured.

The Northern Ireland flags controversy has led to Unicode being unable to release an equivalent country emoji for Northern Ireland, as it has for Scotland, England, and Wales.

Flag proposals

Haass talks
In 2013, US diplomat Richard Haass chaired talks between the political parties in Northern Ireland dealing with, among other things, the issue of flags. The resulting draft proposals, which were not agreed to by the parties, included the idea of a new flag for Northern Ireland, and the possibility of a "circumscribed role for the sovereign flag of Ireland in conjunction with the Union flag."

Proposed "Civic Flag"
In December 2021, the Commission on Flags, Identity, Culture and Tradition (FICT) published its final report which included a recommendation that a new "Civic Flag for Northern Ireland" should be adopted and be flown at buildings of the Northern Ireland Executive, Northern Ireland Assembly and local district councils in Northern Ireland. The commissions suggested that the design for the new flag should incorporate expressions of Britishness and Irishness and should also represent the diversity of the community in Northern Ireland.

See also
 Flag of Northern Ireland
 List of flags of the Republic of Ireland
 List of flags of the United Kingdom
 List of flags used in Northern Ireland
 Cross-border flag for Ireland
 Party Processions Act 1850 Act which banned "any Banner, Emblem, Flag or Symbol, the Display whereof may be calculated or tend to provoke Animosity between different Classes of Her Majesty's Subjects"
 Kerb painting
 Coat of arms of Northern Ireland

References

External links
 Symbols in Northern Ireland - Flags Used in the Region by Dara Mulhern and Martin Melaugh; illustrated article from CAIN Project (Conflict Archive on the INternet)

Issue
Flag controversies
Sectarianism